Turk's cap is a common name for several plants and may refer to:
 Lilium martagon, a lily species native to a wide area from central Europe east to Mongolia and Korea
 Lilium michauxii, a lily species native to southeastern North America
 Lilium superbum, a lily species native to eastern and central regions of North America
 Melocactus, a genus of cactus native to North and South America, many species of which are called Turk's-cap cactus

See also
 Turban squash, a variety of squash also referred to as "Turk's turban"